Ectopoglossus astralogaster is a sparsely-researched species of frog in the family Dendrobatidae. It is known to only be endemic to premontane forests on Cerro Brewster in the western part of Guna Yala, in Panama, at 700 to 900 meters above sea level. 

Ectopoglossus astralogaster is yellowish-brown in coloration, with darker brown markers.

References

Poison dart frogs
Amphibians of Colombia
Endemic fauna of Colombia
Taxonomy articles created by Polbot
Amphibians described in 1991